The following is a list of Eastern Orthodox jurisdictions with a presence in North America that have a Wikipedia article.

Mainstream jurisdictions 
These mainstream Eastern Orthodox jurisdictions are present in North America:
Ecumenical Patriarchate
Greek Orthodox Archdiocese of America
Ukrainian Orthodox Church of the USA
Ukrainian Orthodox Church of Canada
Albanian Orthodox Diocese of America
American Carpatho-Russian Orthodox Diocese
Antiochian Orthodox Christian Archdiocese of North America
Moscow Patriarchate
Russian Orthodox Church in the USA
Russian Orthodox Church Outside Russia
Serbian Orthodox Church in the USA and Canada
Romanian Orthodox Archdiocese of America and Canada
Bulgarian Eastern Orthodox Diocese of the USA, Canada and Australia

Georgian Apostolic Orthodox Church in North America
Orthodox Church in America
 Antiochian Orthodox Archdiocese of Mexico, Venezuela, Central America and the Caribbean

Independent jurisdictions 

 Holy Orthodox Church in North America
 Autonomous Orthodox Metropolia of North and South America and the British Isles

References

External links
 World Orthodox Churches
Official Website of the Assembly of Canonical Orthodox Bishops of the United States of America

Eastern Orthodox dioceses
Eastern Orthodoxy in North America
Dioceses in North America
North America religion-related lists
Eastern Orthodoxy-related lists